Charles M. Weeks House is a historic home located at Huntington in Suffolk County, New York. It is a -story, clapboard residence with a mansard roof.  It was built about 1860 and representative of the Second Empire style.  It has a 2-story shed-roofed kitchen wing. Also on the property is a barn built about 1900.

It was added to the National Register of Historic Places in 1985.

References

Houses on the National Register of Historic Places in New York (state)
Second Empire architecture in New York (state)
Houses completed in 1860
Houses in Suffolk County, New York
National Register of Historic Places in Suffolk County, New York